Tomasz Polewka (born 5 August 1994) is a Polish backstroke swimmer who won the 50 m event at the 2015 European Short Course Championships. He competed in the 100 m backstroke at the 2016 Summer Olympics.

References

External links

 

1994 births
Living people
Polish male backstroke swimmers
Olympic swimmers of Poland
Swimmers at the 2016 Summer Olympics
People from Grudziądz
Sportspeople from Kuyavian-Pomeranian Voivodeship
21st-century Polish people